Aguascalientia is an extinct genus of miniature camelids, endemic to North America (as far south as the Panama Canal) during the Early Miocene 23.0—20.4 mya existing for approximately .

References

Prehistoric camelids
Prehistoric even-toed ungulate genera
Miocene even-toed ungulates
Miocene mammals of North America
Fossil taxa described in 1977